The Royal Manchester Children's Hospital is a children's hospital in Oxford Road, Manchester, England. The Royal Manchester Children's Hospital is managed by the Manchester University NHS Foundation Trust.

History
A new hospital was required to replace services previously provided by the Pendlebury Children's Hospital at Pendlebury in the City of Salford, Booth Hall Children's Hospital at Blackley in north-Manchester, and neonatal care from Saint Mary's Hospital, Manchester. It was procured under a Private Finance Initiative contract in 2004. The new hospital, which was designed by Anshen & Allen and built by Bovis Lend Lease at a cost of approximately £500 million, was completed in April 2009 and opened in June 2009.

Services
The hospital has 371 beds and with 185,000 annual patient visits making it the largest and busiest children's hospital in the United Kingdom.

See also
 List of hospitals in England

References

External links 
Pendlebury Children's Hospital drawing
Royal Manchester Children’s Hospital Charity

Manchester University NHS Foundation Trust
Hospital buildings completed in 2009
NHS hospitals in England
Children's hospitals in the United Kingdom
Hospitals in Manchester